The Election Commission of India held indirect 6th presidential elections of India on 17 August 1974. Fakhruddin Ali Ahmed, from Assam with 765,587 votes won over his nearest rival Tridib Chaudhuri, from West Bengal who got 189,196 votes.

Electoral Change
During the 1974 elections, there was a change in the electoral college. It now had 521 from the Lok Sabha, 230 from the Rajya Sabha and 3654 from the State assemblies.

Schedule
The election schedule was announced by the Election Commission of India on 16 July 1974.

Results
Source: Web archive of Election Commission of India website

See also
 1974 Indian vice presidential election

References

1974 elections in India
Presidential elections in India